Sergey Andreyevich Kosov (born 31 January 1986) is a former Russian professional footballer.

Club career
In 2010, he made an excellent debut for FK Šiauliai and was one of the best goalkeepers in Lithuanian A Lyga. After the expiry of the contract on 15 November 2010, player moved to FK Jūrmala-VV, playing in the Latvian Higher League. After playing 8 league games he was released.

External links
 
 
 

1986 births
Living people
Russian footballers
Association football goalkeepers
FC Zenit Saint Petersburg players
Jakobstads BK players
FC Nistru Otaci players
FC Šiauliai players
FK Daugava (2003) players
Kakkonen players
Moldovan Super Liga players
A Lyga players
Latvian Higher League players
Russian expatriate footballers
Expatriate footballers in Ukraine
Expatriate footballers in Finland
Expatriate footballers in Moldova
Russian expatriate sportspeople in Moldova
Expatriate footballers in Lithuania
Expatriate footballers in Latvia